James Gannon may refer to:

 James Gannon (author), writer and producer of documentaries
 James Gannon (politician) (1859–1924)
 Jim Gannon (born 1968), English footballer and  football manager
 Jim Gannon (rugby league) (born 1977), Australian rugby league player